Luthuli is a name of southern African origin.

 Albert Luthuli (c. 1898–1967), Teacher, activist, politician and Nobel Peace Prize winner
 Luthuli Dlamini (born 1966), Zimbabwe-born South African film and television actor
 Bhekumuzi Luthuli (1961–2010), South African Maskandi musician
 Bhekizizwe Luthuli, South African politician
 Siphelele Luthuli (born 1995), South African professional soccer player

See also 

 Order of Luthuli
 Luthuli House

Surnames
Surnames of African origin